Mark Brokenshire (born 28 February 1961) is an Australian former professional rugby league footballer who played for Manly and Canterbury-Bankstown in the NSWRL competition during the 1980s and 1990s.

Playing career
Brokenshire started his first grade career at Manly in 1987 but was not a part of the grand final winning team of that season.  

In 1990, Brokenshire moved to Canterbury and played in the 1994 grand final defeat against the Canberra Raiders.  

Brokenshire retired at the end of 1994 and went his entire first grade career without scoring a try.

References

1961 births
Living people
Australian rugby league players
Canterbury-Bankstown Bulldogs players
Country New South Wales rugby league team players
Manly Warringah Sea Eagles players
Rugby league players from Murwillumbah
Rugby league props